Il vuoto (Italian for "The void") is a studio album by Italian singer-songwriter Franco Battiato, issued in 2007. Its songs have as a common theme the spiritual void.

Battiato performed the songs "Il vuoto" and "I giorni della monotonia" out of competition at the 57th edition of the Sanremo Music Festival.

Track listing
Music by Franco Battiato. Lyrics by Manlio Sgalambro except where noted.

 "Il vuoto" (featuring MAB) – 3:32
 "I giorni della monotonia" – 3:15
 "Aspettando l'estate" – 3:31
 "Niente è come sembra" – 3:34
 "Tiepido aprile" – 3:12
 "The Game Is Over" – 4:33
 "Era l'inizio della primavera" – 3:01 (music: Pyotr Ilyich Tchaikovsky, lyrics:  Aleksey Konstantinovich Tolstoy)
 "Io chi sono?" – 3:30
 "Stati di gioia" – 4:46

Charts

References

2007 albums
Franco Battiato albums
Italian-language albums